Ahmedabad Kolkata Express, also known as Sare Jahan Se Achchha Express, is an Indian express train. The train was the first express train to travel from Chitpur railway station (Kolkata) to Ahmedabad railway station. It is hauled by a Tughlakabad (TKD) WAG 9 locomotive, and then to Ahmedabad Junction (ADI) by a Patratu or Abu Road based WDM 3A.

History
The Ahmedabad Kolkata Epress initially traveled between Chitpur railway station and Ajmer Junction railway station as a 13 coach train. Later the terminating station was changed to Ahmedabad railway station via Ajmer.

Route
The train ran from Ahmedabad to Kolkata via Ajmer, Ratlam, Bhopal, Chopan, Barkakana, Dhanbad and Asansol.
The train was rerouted in 2021 and now it goes from Ahmedabad to Chhayapuri, Ratlam, Sant Hirdaram Nagar, Chopan, Barkakana, Dhanbad and Asansol to reach Kolkata Chitpur.

Direction Reversal
The train used to reverse its directions 5 times at Ajmer, Ratlam, Bhopal, Chopan and Barkakana. It had the highest number of direction reversals in India. The new route reversed direction twice, at Chopan and Barkakana.

Service
The trains have normal priority on the Indian railway network. They offer four classes of service: Second Class AC 2-tier (bays of 4 berths + 2 berth on the side) with open system berth, Second Class AC 3-tier (bays of 6 berths + 2 berths on the side) with open system berth and Second class 3 tier sleeper (bays of6 berths + 2 berths on the side). Generally it has 1 AC 2-Tiers, up to 2 AC 3-Tiers ( both of which may be increased according to demand). It has no pantry car, 7 UR (Unreserved) and 2 SLR (Second-class Luggage/parcel van + guard van ('G' missing).

The train covers a distance of  in nearly 42 hrs.

Coach composition

See also

Express trains in India
List of named passenger trains of India

References

Transport in Kolkata
Transport in Ahmedabad
Rail transport in Uttar Pradesh
Rail transport in Madhya Pradesh
Rail transport in Gujarat
Rail transport in Rajasthan
Rail transport in Jharkhand
Rail transport in West Bengal
Express trains in India